Dyschirius perversus is a species of ground beetle in the subfamily Scaritinae. It was described by Henry Clinton Fall in 1922.

References

perversus
Beetles described in 1922